Ummak huriyya salad is a salad made up of carrots, onions, garlic, salt, spices, harissa, olive oil, lemon juice and then decorated with parsley, olives and eggs.

See also
 List of Arabic salads

References

Arab cuisine
Tunisian cuisine
Salads